Liolaemus josei is a species of lizard in the family Iguanidae.  It is found in Argentina.

References

josei
Lizards of South America
Reptiles of Argentina
Endemic fauna of Argentina
Reptiles described in 2005
Taxa named by Cristian Simón Abdala